Live: ...Just Beautiful is a live performance album by Shockabilly, released in 1989 by Shimmy Disc. It includes live tracks recorded on tour between 1984 and 1985 in Austria, Germany and the United States in addition to remixed tracks taken from The Dawn of Shockabilly.

Track listing

Personnel
Adapted from the Live: ...Just Beautiful liner notes.

Shockabilly
 Eugene Chadbourne – vocals, electric guitar
 Kramer – vocals, organ, tape, bass guitar, production
 David Licht – percussion

Production and additional personnel
 Michael Macioce – cover art

Release history

References

External links 
 

1989 live albums
Shockabilly albums
Albums produced by Kramer (musician)
Shimmy Disc live albums